Devendra Paudel is a Nepalese Politician and serving as the Member Of House Of Representatives (Nepal) also has been elected as Education Minister of Nepal elected from Baglung-2, Province No. 3. He is the member of CPN (Maoist Centre).

References 

Living people
Nepal MPs 2017–2022
Nepal Communist Party (NCP) politicians
Communist Party of Nepal (Maoist Centre) politicians
Government ministers of Nepal
Education ministers of Nepal
1965 births
Nepal MPs 2022–present